Ilya Vladimirovich Vasilyev (born 24 April 1997) is a Russian football player who plays for Belshina Bobruisk.

Club career
He made his debut in the Russian Professional Football League for FC Dynamo Bryansk on 26 July 2018 in a game against FC Kvant Obninsk.

References

External links
 Profile by Russian Professional Football League
 
 

1997 births
People from Lomonosovsky District, Leningrad Oblast
Sportspeople from Leningrad Oblast
Living people
Russian footballers
Association football midfielders
Russian expatriate footballers
Expatriate footballers in Belarus
FC Tosno players
FC Dynamo Bryansk players
FC Vitebsk players
FC Belshina Bobruisk players